Ilaria D'Amico (born 30 August 1973) is a commentator and television host on Italian television. She is most known for her work on shows related to football in fact in June 2018 she left Italian Sky Sport.

Personal life
As of 2014, D'Amico has been in a relationship with  Juventus and former Italian national team goalkeeper Gianluigi Buffon, following his separation from his wife Alena Šeredová. Prior to her relationship with Buffon, D'Amico had been in a relationship with Rocco Attisani, a real estate developer and entrepreneur, with whom she had a son, Pietro. In 2015, Buffon announced that he and D'Amico were expecting a child together, and on 6 January 2016, the couple announced, on Twitter, the birth of their son Leopoldo Mattia. D'Amico, as well as her partner Buffon, was one of over 80 Italian celebrities to sign a petition in favour of the 2016 referendum on constitutional reform. In the summer of 2017, she and Buffon became engaged.

References

1973 births
Living people
Mass media people from Rome
Italian television personalities
Women association football commentators